Catharina Joanna Maria Halkes (Vlaardingen, 2 July 1920 - Nijmegen, 21 April 2011) was a Dutch theologian and feminist, notable for having been the first Dutch professor of feminism and Christianity, at the Radboud University Nijmegen from 1983 to 1986. A Roman Catholic who was originally schooled in Dutch language and literature, she became active in the women's movement within the church, and gained a measure of notoriety when she was forbidden to address Pope John Paul II during his visit to the Netherlands in 1985. She is considered the founding mother of feminist theology in the Netherlands.

Accomplishments 
Halkes was the first professor of Feminism and Christianity at Radboud University in The Netherlands, which was then known as the Catholic University of Nijmegen.

References

External links
Prof. Halkes' retirement speech from Radboud University Nijmegen
Catharina Halkes Foundation

1920 births
2011 deaths
20th-century Dutch Roman Catholic theologians
21st-century Dutch Roman Catholic theologians
Dutch feminists
Christian feminist theologians
People from Vlaardingen
Academic staff of Radboud University Nijmegen